Mitromica gallegoi is a species of sea snail, a marine gastropod mollusk, in the family Costellariidae, the ribbed miters.

Distribution
This species occurs in Nicaraguan part of the Caribbean Sea.

References

Costellariidae